Crazy Noise may refer to:

 Crazy Noise (Stezo album), 1989
 Crazy Noise (Hillsong album), 2011